"Tala" is a song by Filipino singer and actress Sarah Geronimo co-written with Nica del Rosario and Emmanuel Sambayan with music and production by Jumbo De Belen and Alisson Shore of Flip Music Production. It was released as the lead single from Geronimo's platinum album The Great Unknown.

The single won “Song of the Year” at the 2017 Myx Music Awards. In 2018, Geronimo performed the song at the ASEAN-Japan Music Festival held in Tokyo. In 2019, CNN Philippines named the song as the Best OPM song of 2010s. A sleeper hit, "Tala" gained considerable popularity three years after its release in 2019. In 2020, the song have earned a total of almost two hundred million views.

Live performances 
Sarah Geronimo premiered Tala on her From the Top concert in December 2015. She also performed the song on various album mall tour for The Great Unknown in the Philippines. On ASAP stage, the popstar performed the hit four times. She also made an acoustic version of the song for her The Great Unknown Unplugged concert. It also became one of the highlights of her This 15 Me concert in Smart Araneta Coliseum.

Music video
The music video shows Sarah Geronimo's sexier side as she shows off her Georcelle Dapat-Sy Choreographed dance moves along with the G-force while performing the song. It was directed by Paul Basinilio. The music video was premiered on Myx, and posted on Viva Records official YouTube Channel on June 11, 2016. As of November 2019, the video has garnered over 15 million views. The video reached the 25 million mark on the first day of 2020. The music video throned the most viewed OPM music video by a female solo act in March 2020 with over 100 million views, beating Yeng Constantino's Ikaw which had over 104 million views. It is also the most liked and most viewed OPM music video of all time with 158 million views, surpassing Buwan by Juan Karlos and Kung 'Di Rin Lang Ikaw by December Avenue and Moira Dela Torre.

Notable covers 

 The song was covered by PBB Teen Housemate, Vivoree.
 Encantadia’s Glaiza de Castro made a dance cover of the song.
 Ella Cruz uploaded a dance cover of the song on her YouTube channel, she also performed the song along with Julian Trono during the 2017 Myx Music Awards.
 Filipina singer-songwriter Donnalyn Bartolome made a dance cover of the song, it was uploaded on her YouTube channel.
 AC Bonifacio performed the hit numerous times, she also made a dance cover of the song with The Voice winner Jason Dy.
 Diva Montelaba made a dance cover of the song.
 The Addlib made a dance cover of the song and was uploaded to their YouTube channel.
 In May 2018, Geronimo was impersonated in Your Face Sounds Familiar Kids 2 by contestant Sheena Belarmino and performed the hit song.
 Filipina girl group After 5 performed the song live on Wish FM Bus. 
 Anne Curtis performed the song with Geronimo on her "AnneKulit: Promise, Last Na 'To!" concert held in Smart Araneta Coliseum.
 South Korean boy band WINNER surprised fans in Manila by dancing to Sarah Geronimo's "Tala" during their concert in the Mall of Asia Arena in Pasay on Saturday January 25, 2020.

Media usage 
 A version of the song with modified lyrics was used in a Jollibee advertisement featuring Anne Curtis.
 Award-winning Filipino magazine show Kapuso Mo, Jessica Soho used the song as the theme for its "Selos Sa Peryahan" feature.
The song was used for the first lip-sync battle on Season 1 of the Philippines’ version of Rupaul’s Drag Race.

Charts

Awards

References 

2015 songs
2016 singles
Sarah Geronimo songs
Tagalog-language songs
Philippine pop songs
Viral videos